The 1966–67 Segunda Divisão season was the 33rd season of the competition and the 33rd season of recognized second-tier football in Portugal.

League standings

Segunda Divisão - Zona Norte

Segunda Divisão - Zona Sul

Championship play-off

References

Portuguese Second Division seasons
Port
2